Kim Kwang-hoon (김광훈; born January 31, 1982) is a South Korean weightlifter. His personal best is 369 kg.

At the 2004 Summer Olympics he ranked 10th in the 77 kg category, with a total of 350 kg.

At the 2007 World Weightlifting Championships he ranked 4th in the 77 kg category, with a total of 356 kg.

He competed in Weightlifting at the 2008 Summer Olympics in the 77 kg division finishing fourth with 355 kg.

At the 2009 East Asian Games he ranked 1st in the 77 kg category, with a total of 352 kg.

At the 2010 Asian Games he ranked 3rd in the 85 kg category, with a total of 369 kg.

References

External links
 NBC profile
 Athlete Biography KIM Kwanghoon at beijing2008

South Korean male weightlifters
1982 births
Living people
Weightlifters at the 2004 Summer Olympics
Weightlifters at the 2008 Summer Olympics
Olympic weightlifters of South Korea
Asian Games medalists in weightlifting
Weightlifters at the 2010 Asian Games
Asian Games bronze medalists for South Korea
Medalists at the 2010 Asian Games
20th-century South Korean people
21st-century South Korean people